Církvice is a municipality and village in Kutná Hora District in the Central Bohemian Region of the Czech Republic. It has about 1,300 inhabitants.

Administrative parts
The village of Jakub is an administrative part of Církvice.

Geography
The villages of Církvice and Jakub are urbanistically merged. The municipality lies in a flat agricultural landscape of the Central Elbe Table lowland. The Klejnárka River flows through the municipality. There are several ponds around the villages.

History

The first written mention of Církvice is from 1276.

Transport
The I/38 road from Jihlava to Kolín passess through the municipality.

Církvice is located on the railway line leading from Kolín to Havlíčkův Brod.

Sights
The Church of Saint James the Great in Jakub is one of the most important Romanesque buildings in the country, protected as a national cultural monument. This church was built between 1148 and 1165. Several reconstructions and modifications were made, but in 1872–1874 the church was cleaned of these reconstructions and its purely Romanesque character was restored. The preserved sculptural decoration is also unique and very valuable.

The Church of Saint Lawrence in Církvice was probably built at the end of the 13th century and was first documented in 1352. In the second half of the 17th century, the original Gothic building was baroque rebuilt. Valuable is also the early Baroque rectory.

References

External links

Villages in Kutná Hora District